Allotoca meeki, commonly known as the Zirahuen allotoca or the tiro de Zirahuén, is a species of fish endemic to Lake Zirahuén, a small endorheic mountain lake in Michoacán state of central Mexico. 

The specific name honours the American ichthyologist Seth Eugene Meek (1859-1914) who wrote the first review of the fishes of Mexico.

Conservation
The Zirahuén allotoca is critically endangered. The species has a small range, limited to a single lake basin. Two non-native predatory species of bass (Micropterus salmoides and M. punctulatus) were introduced to Lake Zirahuén in 1933, and by the 1990s the allotoca had been extirpated from the lake.

A population survived in the Estanque de Condempas in Opopeo, a small lake on the Río El Silencio tributary of Lake Zirahuén. Bass invaded the estanque in the 2000s, and by 2011 no allotocas could be found there. As of 2017 a few allotocas have survived in an outlet of the lake, and in a nearby spring-fed pond where bass are also found.

References

meeki
Freshwater fish of Mexico
Endemic fish of Mexico
Natural history of Michoacán
Taxa named by Jose Álvarez del Villar
Fish described in 1959